Gojō Station may refer to:
 Gojō Station (Kyoto), a subway station on the Karasuma Line in Kyoto, Japan
 Gojō Station (Nara), a railway station on the Wakayama Line in Nara Prefecture, Japan
 Nishitetsu Gojō Station, a railway station on the Nishitetsu Dazaifu Line in Fukuoka Prefecture, Japan
 Kiyomizu-Gojō Station, a railway station on the Keihan Main Line in Kyoto, Japan (formerly called Gojō Station)